Golden Bay High School is a secondary school in Golden Bay, New Zealand.

References

Secondary schools in New Zealand
Schools in the Tasman District
Tākaka